The 1972 Virginia Slims of Richmond  was a women's tennis tournament played on indoor clay courts at the Westwood Racquet Club in Richmond, Virginia in the United States that was part of the 1972 Women's Tennis Circuit. It was the second edition of the tournament and was held from March 21 through March 26, 1972. Third-seeded Billie Jean King won the singles title and earned $3,400 first-prize money.

Finals

Singles
 Billie Jean King defeated  Nancy Gunter 6–3, 6–4

Doubles
 Rosie Casals /  Billie Jean King defeated  Judy Dalton /  Karen Krantzcke 7–5, 7–6

Prize money

References

Virginia Slims of Richmond
1972 in sports in Virginia
Virginia Slims of Richmond
March 1972 sports events in the United States